Raigyne Louis (born September 3, 1994) is an American professional basketball player. She was drafted by the Las Vegas Aces in the 2018 WNBA draft. She played college basketball at LSU.

College career
Louis came out of high school as the 18th overall ranked recruit per ESPN's HoopGurlz Top 100. She was the 6th overall guard in the class, as well. Louis committed to LSU after also taking official visits to Miami, Oklahoma, and South Carolina. Louis became the highest guard signed by LSU since Allison Hightower in 2006.

Louis was named to the SEC All-Freshman team during her first season in Baton Rouge. During the 2016–2017 season, Louis had one of her best season for the Tigers. She was named to the All-SEC 2nd Team, All-Defensive Team, and was named the conference's Defensive Player of the Year. She finished off her career at LSU by making the All-SEC 1st Team.

In 2020, Louis was ranked in the Top 44 LSU Athletes of the Decade at #43 by LSU SB Nation.

Professional career

Las Vegas Aces
Louis was drafted in the 3rd Round of the 2018 WNBA draft by the Las Vegas Aces. Louis impressed Head Coach Bill Laimbeer with her defensive intensity during training camp. Laimbeer stated that "she was probably the best defender we have in camp."  Louis made the Aces's opening night roster, but was waived later in May to make room for players returning from their overseas commitments.

WNBA career statistics

Regular season

|-
| align="left" | 2018†
| align="left" | Las Vegas
| 2 || 0 || 10.5 || .400 || .000 || .667 || 2.0 || 0.5 || 0.5 || 0.0 || 2.0 ||| 3.0
|-
| align="left" | Career
| align="left" | 1 year, 1 team
| 2 || 0 || 10.5 || .400 || .000 || .667 || 2.0 || 0.5 || 0.5 || 0.0 || 2.0 ||| 3.0

Personal life
Louis married LSU football player Lamar Louis in July 2017.

References

External links
WNBA bio
LSU Tigers bio

1994 births
Living people
American women's basketball players
Basketball players from Florida
Guards (basketball)
LSU Lady Tigers basketball players
Las Vegas Aces draft picks
Las Vegas Aces players
Fort Lauderdale, Florida